The International Typographers' Secretariat (ITS) was a global union federation bringing together unions of printers around the world.

History
An International Typographical Congress was held in Paris in July 1889, and this led to a determination to form a permanent organisation.  This was established in Bern in 1892, as the International Printers' Secretariat.  It held further congresses in Geneva in 1896, Lucerne in 1901, Paris in 1907, and Stuttgart in 1912.

In 1939, the federation agreed to merge with the Lithographers' International and the International Federation of Bookbinders and Kindred Trades.  However, due to World War II, no progress was made until 1946, when the British Printing and Kindred Trades Federation established a committee which drafted a constitution for a merged organisation.  This was established in 1949, as the International Graphical Federation.

Affiliates
As of 1910, the following unions were affiliated to the federation:

General Secretaries
1893: Gottfried Reimann
1896: Friedrich Siebenmann
1902: Pierre Stautner
1921: Fritz Verdan
1926: Hans Grundbacher
1947: Gottfried Reinhard (acting)

References

Trade unions established in 1889
Trade unions disestablished in 1949
Global union federations
Printing trade unions